This is a list of species in the genus Hybomitra.

Hybomitra species

References

External links
Images representing Hybomitra 

Hybomitra